Maynard H. Jackson High School (MJHS, or Jackson High) is a high school of approximately 1,000 students, with the capacity for 1,500.  Jackson High is located in southeast Atlanta, Georgia, United States along the BeltLine in Grant Park, just south of I-20. The school is a part of Atlanta Public Schools.  In July 2017, Dr. Adam Danser was appointed as principal.

Faculty and students at Jackson High operate in three Small Learning Communities, also known as SLCs: Engineering and Early College, Information Technology, and Fine Arts. Jackson High offers the International Baccalaureate diploma programme to students in all three SLCs.

The school was designated a GE Foundation "College Bound" school in 2002 and received a five-year, $1 million grant to help increase student readiness for college courses.

History

In 1872, the Atlanta Public Schools commenced operations with seven schools, including Girls High.  In 1924, the city opened a new Girls High facility in Grant Park.   In 1947, the Atlanta Board of Education moved to community high schools, and transitioned the Girls High building into Roosevelt High.  Roosevelt High served as a community high school to Grant Park and surrounding neighborhoods from 1947 until 1985.

The school's current campus opened as Southside High School in the second semester of 1986 on the site overlooked by the former Girls High / Roosevelt High.  Southside consolidated the former Roosevelt High and the former Hoke Smith High.  In 1988, nearby East Atlanta High closed, with East Atlanta students rezoned to Southside.  In 2005, Southside's boundary expanded further on the transition of Kirkwood's of Alonzo A Crim from a comprehensive high to an open campus.

In the summer of 2008, the school was renamed Maynard H. Jackson High School to commemorate the city’s first black mayor, Maynard Jackson.  In early 2012, Jackson High hosted a  tribute to Maynard Jackson, including a special archive sponsored by the Maynard Jackson Youth Foundation.

In the summer of 2012, the school relocated temporarily to the campus of Coan Middle School for a 13-month renovation.

Students returned to the original Grant Park location on January 8, 2014, for the spring semester. The $48.3 million  renovation included a roof top community farm and garden, renovated auditorium, new softball field, and new classroom corridors.

Small Learning Communities

Jackson's Information Technology SLC was created out of the Information Technology magnet program that predated the SLC approach.  Students in the IT SLC follow two Pathways.  Pathway I, Computing, focuses on software development and includes a dual enrollment option.  Pathway II, Interactive Media, focuses on web design.

Jackson's Engineering and Early College (E2C) SLC was formed as part of the University System of Georgia's Early College initiative.  E2C partners with Atlanta Metropolitan College, with faculty from Atlanta Metro teaching courses offered by Atlanta Metro at the Jackson campus.  Classes offered by E2C include circuitry, electronics, foundations of electronics, and early college courses in math, English and social studies.

Jackson's Fine Arts and Media Communications SLC (FAMC) features a dance program partnered with the Atlanta Ballet.  FAMC students can also study video broadcasting production and studio art.

International Baccalaureate
Students from all three of Jackson's SLCs may enroll in the pre-IB programme in 9th and 10th grades.  Commencing in August 2013, 11th grade students may begin the IB diploma programme.

Extracurricular activities
Maynard H. Jackson High School has many athletic and academic organizations. The school has a large Army JROTC program. The school fields teams in cross country, basketball, soccer, football, track, lacrosse, tennis, softball, and baseball, as well as other athletic organizations including a golf club. Other extracurriculars include marching band, drill team, orchestra, chorus, drama, and various academic clubs. The baseball team went to the 5A state playoffs in both 2018 and 2019, with 2018 being the first time in school history. The girls track and field team won the GHSA state championship in 2015 and 2016.

Dress code
Jackson High has prescribed uniforms and students are required to follow a dress code.

Feeder patterns

As of 2013-14, Jackson High's feeder pattern includes seven traditional zoned elementary schools and one traditional zoned middle school.  The traditional elementary schools feeding into King Middle School and then Jackson High are Benteen. Burgess-Peterson Academy, Dunbar, Parkside, Barack and Michelle Obama Academy, and Toomer. In addition, many students from nearby charter schools Atlanta Neighborhood Charter School and Wesley International Academy enroll in the school.

Notable alumni

 Greg Favors - football player, Kansas City Chiefs, 1998; Tennessee Titans, 1999-2001; Indianapolis Colts, 2002; Buffalo Bills, 2002; Louisville Cardinals, 2003; Jacksonville Jaguars, 2004-2005
 Lorenzo Mauldin - football player, Louisville Cardinals, New York Jets
 Richard Raglin - football player, Louisville Cardinals, Cincinnati Bengals

References

External links
Maynard Holbrook Jackson High School

Atlanta Public Schools high schools
Educational institutions established in 1994
Magnet schools in Georgia (U.S. state)
1994 establishments in Georgia (U.S. state)